Luxilites is an extinct genus of prehistoric bony fish.

References

Tselfatiiformes
Cretaceous fish of North America